Mirosław Korneliusz Jabłoński (born 16 September 1950) is a Polish football manager.

References

1950 births
Living people
Sportspeople from Warsaw
Polish football managers
Gwardia Warsaw managers
Górnik Wałbrzych (football) managers
Polonia Warsaw managers
Legia Warsaw managers
Zagłębie Lubin managers
Amica Wronki managers
Wisła Płock managers
ŁKS Łódź managers
Górnik Łęczna managers
Bruk-Bet Termalica Nieciecza managers
OKS Stomil Olsztyn managers
Legionovia Legionowo managers